Wang Xiaoli (born 24 June 1989) is a Chinese badminton player who is a doubles specialist. In 2012, she competed at the 2012 London Summer Olympics.

Career 
In 2005, she joined the Chinese national second team and officially became the first team in 2008. Wang Xiaoli began her international career in 2009 when she paired with Tao Jiaming in mixed doubles and with Ma Jin in women's doubles. She quickly gained success with Ma Jin and culminated their career with a gold medal at the 2009 Asia Championships. In the middle of the 2010 season, Wang Xiaoli dropped mixed doubles from her repertoire of events and began competing in women's doubles with Yu Yang. Despite their short time together, Wang Xiaoli and Yu Yang have reached the number one ranking in the world for their event. In 2011, she and Yu Yang received an award "BWF Female Player of the Year", who have become the first shuttlers to scoop a grand slam with their 5 BWF World Superseries Premier titles in 2011. Having only teamed up for slightly over a year, they have already picked up the 2011 World title and were also champions at the 2011 Asian Championships. They also made 12 consecutive finals appearances with 7 BWF World Superseries titles to their name in 2011.

At the 2012 Summer Olympics, Wang and her partner, Yu Yang, along with Jung Kyung-eun and Kim Ha-na, Ha Jung-eun and Kim Min-jung of South Korea, and Meiliana Jauhari and Greysia Polii of Indonesia, were disqualified from the competition for "not using one's best efforts to win a match" and "conducting oneself in a manner that is clearly abusive or detrimental to the sport", following matches the previous evening during which they were accused of throwing the match.  Yu Yang and Wang Xiaoli played against South Korea's Jung Kyung-eun and Kim Ha-na, and it has been suggested that both teams wanted to lose in order to secure an easier draw, although Yu claimed "she and her partner were just trying to conserve their strength for the knockout rounds".

Achievements

BWF World Championships 
Women's doubles

Asian Games 
Women's doubles

Asian Championships 
Women's doubles

East Asian Games 
Women's doubles

BWF World Junior Championships 
Girls' doubles

Mixed doubles

Asian Junior Championships 
Girls' doubles

BWF Superseries 
The BWF Superseries, which was launched on 14 December 2006 and implemented in 2007, is a series of elite badminton tournaments, sanctioned by the Badminton World Federation (BWF). BWF Superseries levels are Superseries and Superseries Premier. A season of Superseries consists of twelve tournaments around the world that have been introduced since 2011. Successful players are invited to the Superseries Finals, which are held at the end of each year.

Women's doubles

Mixed doubles

  BWF Superseries Finals tournament
  BWF Superseries Premier tournament
  BWF Superseries tournament

BWF Grand Prix 
The BWF Grand Prix had two levels, the BWF Grand Prix and Grand Prix Gold. It was a series of badminton tournaments sanctioned by the Badminton World Federation (BWF) which was held from 2007 to 2017.

Women's doubles

  BWF Grand Prix Gold tournament
  BWF Grand Prix tournament

Record against selected opponents 
Women's doubles results with Yu Yang against Superseries Finals finalists, Worlds Semi-finalists, and Olympic quarterfinalists.

 / Petya Nedelcheva & Anastasia Russkikh 1–0
  Alex Bruce & Michelle Li 1–0
  Bao Yixin & Lu Lu 1–0
  Bao Yixin & Zhong Qianxin 3–0
  Cheng Shu & Zhao Yunlei 6–0
  Ma Jin & Zhong Qianxin 1–0
  Tian Qing & Zhao Yunlei 8–3
  Xia Huan & Tang Jinhua 3–1
  Ma Jin & Tang Jinhua 5–0
  Bao Yixin & Cheng Shu 0–1
  Bao Yixin & Tang Jinhua 0–1
  Ma Jin & Tang Yuanting 3–0
  Bao Yixin & Tang Yuanting 0–1
  Luo Ying & Luo Yu 4–0
  Cheng Wen-hsing & Chien Yu-chin 4–0
  Christinna Pedersen & Kamilla Rytter Juhl 6–1
  Poon Lok Yan & Tse Ying Suet 8–0
  Jwala Gutta & Ashwini Ponnappa 3–0
  Vita Marissa & Nadya Melati 2–0
  Mizuki Fujii & Reika Kakiiwa 4–0
  Miyuki Maeda & Satoko Suetsuna 5–0
  Shizuka Matsuo & Mami Naito 7–0
  Misaki Matsutomo & Ayaka Takahashi 3–0
  Ha Jung-eun & Kim Min-jung 7–1
  Jung Kyung-eun & Kim Ha-na 5–0
  Chin Eei Hui & Wong Pei Tty 2–0
  Valeria Sorokina & Nina Vislova 1–0
  Shinta Mulia Sari & Yao Lei 2–0
  Michelle Claire Edwards & Annari Viljoen 1–0
  Duanganong Aroonkesorn & Kunchala Voravichitchaikul 5–0

References 

1989 births
Living people
Badminton players from Hubei
Chinese female badminton players
Badminton players at the 2012 Summer Olympics
Olympic badminton players of China
Badminton players at the 2010 Asian Games
Badminton players at the 2014 Asian Games
Asian Games gold medalists for China
Asian Games silver medalists for China
Asian Games medalists in badminton
Medalists at the 2010 Asian Games
Medalists at the 2014 Asian Games
World No. 1 badminton players
BWF Best Female Player of the Year